Easter Seals can refer to:

Easterseals (U.S.) – formerly "Easter Seals", an international charitable organization devoted to providing opportunities for children and adults with physical disabilities.
Easter Seals (Canada) – a Canadian organization inspired by the United States-based organization
Easter seals (philately) – stamps issued by the above organizations

See also
Christmas Seal stamps benefiting the American Lung Association